is a Japanese football player. He plays for FC Osaka.

Playing career
Junichi Kono joined to J3 League club; FC Ryukyu in 2014. In 2016, he moved to FC Osaka.

References

External links

1992 births
Living people
Doshisha University alumni
Association football people from Hyōgo Prefecture
Japanese footballers
J3 League players
Japan Football League players
FC Ryukyu players
FC Osaka players
Association football goalkeepers